Bronwyn Katz (born 1993) is a South African sculptor and visual artist. She is a founding member of iQhiya Collective, a network of young black female artists based in Cape Town and Johannesburg, South Africa.

Early years and education 
Katz was born in 1993 in Kimberley, South Africa. She attended the University of Cape Town, South Africa and graduated in 2015 with a BFA. She was awarded with the Simon Gerson Prize at the University of Cape Town.

Career 
Katz's works incorporates sculpture, installation, video and performance. Using the concept of land as a repository of memory, Her works reflect the notion of place or space as lived experience and hence the ability of the land to remember and communicate the memory of its occupation. In 2016, her solo exhibition titled Groenpunt was held at Blank Projects in Cape Town.

Exhibitions 
Katz has held five solo exhibitions and participated in several group exhibitions including;

 The 12th Dak’Art Biennale in Senegal (2016)
 Le jour qui vient - Galerie des Galeries in Paris (2017) 
 Tell Freedom - Kunsthal KAdE in Amersvoort (2018)
 Sculpture - Institute of Contemporary Art Indian Ocean, Port Louis in Mauritius (2018)
 A Silent Line, Lives Here at the Palais de Tokyo in Paris (2018)
 Salvaged Letter at Peres Projects in Berlin (2019)
 Blank Projects in Cape Town (2019)
 Là où les eaux se mêlent (Where the water mingles) (Biennale de Lyon, Lyon, 2019)
 The Empathy Lab (Jessica Silverman Gallery, San Francisco, 2019)
 Material Insanity - Museum of African Contemporary Art Al Maaden in Marrakech (2019) 
 Road to the Unconscious - Peres Projects in Berlin (2019)

Residencies 

 2018 - SAM Art Projects residency, Paris
 2018 - CBK Zuidoost residency, Amersfoort
 2018 NIROX Sculpture Park residency

Awards 

 2015 - She received the Simon Gershwin Prize at University of Cape Town
 2019 - She won the FNB Art Prize

Personal life 
Katz lives and works in Johannesburg.

References

1993 births
Living people
University of Cape Town alumni
South African sculptors
People from Kimberley, Northern Cape
21st-century South African women artists